Following is the list of 20 government ministers serving under Oommen Chandy, the Chief Minister of the Indian state of Kerala, from August 2004 through May 2006.

Trivia 
Oommen Chandy was sworn in as the Chief Minister of Kerala on 31 August 2004 after the controversial resignation of A. K. Antony on 29 August. All ministers in the previous Antony government except K.M. Mani, P.K. Kunjalikkutty, K.R. Gowri Amma, M.V. Raghavan, Dr. M.K. Muneer, Babu Divakaran and C.F. Thomas were ousted. Kunjalikkutty resigned on 31 December 2004, after finding himself guilty in the notorious Ice Cream Parlour Scandal. He was succeeded by his colleague V.K. Ibrahim Kunju the next day (1 January 2005). K.P. Viswanathan, who handled the department of Forests, resigned on 9 February 2005 after a series of scandals, and A. Sujanapal succeeded him on 4 January 2006. In the interval, the CM himself handled the department of Forests.

See also 
 Chief Minister of Kerala
 List of Chief Ministers of Kerala
 List of Kerala ministers

References

Chandy 01
Indian National Congress state ministries
Indian National Congress of Kerala
2004 establishments in Kerala
2006 disestablishments in India
Cabinets established in 2004
Cabinets disestablished in 2006